The Dumbarton Oaks Medieval Library (est. 2010) is a series of books published by Harvard University Press in collaboration with the Dumbarton Oaks Research Library and Collection. It presents editions of texts originally written in medieval Latin, Byzantine Greek, and Old English, with facing-page translations into modern English. The aim is to make such texts accessible to English-speaking scholars and general readers.

The general editor is Daniel Donoghue.  The language editors are Daniel Donoghue (Old English), Danuta Shanzer (Medieval Latin), Alice-Mary Talbot (Byzantine Greek, 2010–2019), and Alexander Alexakis and Richard Greenfield (Byzantine Greek coeditors, 2019 to the present). The founding editor of the series was Jan M. Ziolkowski; he served as general editor from 2010 to 2020.

The series is a sister of three others published by Harvard University Press: Loeb Classical Library, I Tatti Renaissance Library, and Murty Classical Library of India.

Volumes

References

External links 
 The Dumbarton Oaks Medieval Library
 The Dumbarton Oaks Medieval Library on the Harvard University Press website
 Dumbarton Oaks website
 Harvard University Press
 Harvard University Press Blog post on DOML edition, Saints' Lives of Henry of Avranches

Series of books
Harvard University Press books
Classics publications
Dual-language series of texts
Translations into English
Book series introduced in 2010